Máirtín O'Connor is an Irish button accordionist from Galway, Ireland, who began playing at the age of nine, and whose career has seen him as a member of many traditional music groups that include Skylark, Midnight Well, De Dannan, and The Boys of the Lough. A traditional Irish musician, O'Connor was one of the major forces of the music in the world-renowned Riverdance.

His first solo album A Connachtman's Rambles established him as a solo musician and proved a major critical success. O'Connor has released three albums since; Perpetual Motion, released in 1990, Chatterbox, released in 1993, and The Road West, released in 2005.

Discography

Solo work
 The Connachtman's Rambles (1979)
 Perpetual Motion (1990)
 Chatterbox (1993)
 The Road West (2001)
 Rain of Light (2003)

With others
 EastWind (1992)
 Crossroads with Cathal Hayden and Seamie O'Dowd (2008)
 Going Places with Cathal Hayden and Seamie O'Dowd, as Máirtín O'Connor Band (2011)
 Zoë Conway, Dónal Lunny and Máirtín O' Connor 2016

Session work
 A Stór Is A Stóirín (1994)
 Riverdance: Music from the Show (1995)
 When I Was Young (1997)
 Fis Carolan's Dream (Garry O'Briain) (1998)

References

External links
Máirtín O'Connor Facebook site

Year of birth missing (living people)
Living people
Irish folk musicians
Irish accordionists
Irish session musicians
The Boys of the Lough members
De Dannan members
People from County Galway
21st-century accordionists
Claddagh Records artists